Burr may refer to:

Places
Burr (crater), on the Jovian moon Callisto

Burr, Minnesota, an unincorporated community,  United States
Burr, Missouri, an unincorporated community, United States
Burr, Nebraska, a village, United States
Burr, Saskatchewan, a hamlet in Canada
Burr, Texas, an unincorporated community, United States
Burr, West Virginia, an unincorporated community, United States
Burr Point, the easternmost point of mainland Ireland
Cape Burr, headland in South Australia
Mount Burr, South Australia, a town and mountain in South Australia

People
Aaron Burr, an American politician and lawyer in the late 18th and early 19th century
Burr (surname)
Burr (given name)

Arts and entertainment
Burr (novel), a book about Aaron Burr by Gore Vidal
Burr Redding, a fictional character in the television series Oz

Other uses
Burr (edge), deformation of metal wherein a raised edge forms on a metal part which has been machined
Burr (cutter), a small cutter used in rotary tools for metalworking
Burr mill, used to grind hard, small food products
Bur or burr, a spiky seed pod
Burl, burr in British English, an irregular growth in trees
Burr or Borr, a god of Norse mythology
× Burrageara, an orchid genus for which the abbreviation is Burr.
Butch cut, a haircut, for which burr is an alternative name
Burr distribution, a statistical continuous probability distribution
Burr Gymnasium, a multi-purpose arena in Washington, D.C., home of the Howard University basketball team
Burr puzzle, a type of interlocking mechanical puzzle
Burr Truss, an architectural feature often used in covered bridges

See also
Northumbrian Burr, a distinctive pronunciation of the letter R found in the northeast of England
Bur (disambiguation)
Burl (disambiguation)